Hervotype is a specific sequence of a particular human endogenous retroviral (HERV) insertion. Hervotyping, like genotyping, is the process of determining the specific sequence of a particular HERV. With more research on HERV, it is now known that HERV may not be monomorphic and a HERV insertion may be present in various alleles. Therefore, it is important to know the hervotype of a HERV insertion as the sequences can give more information on their ages. It is now believed that it is not enough to say whether a HERV is present or present in full form but hervotypes are essential in evaluating their relationship to human disease and to know their true contribution in evolution of humans.

References

Endogenous retroviruses